Yellowknife is the capital, largest community, and only city in the Northwest Territories, Canada.

Yellowknife and its surrounding water bodies were named after a local Dene tribe, who were known as the "Copper Indians" or "Yellowknife Indians", today incorporated as the Yellowknives Dene First Nation. They traded tools made from copper deposits near the Arctic Coast. Its population, which is ethnically mixed, was 20,340 per the 2021 Canadian Census. Of the eleven official languages of the Northwest Territories, five are spoken in significant numbers in Yellowknife: Dene Suline, Dogrib, South and North Slavey, English, and French. In the Dogrib language, the city is known as Sǫǫ̀mbak’è ("where the money is"). Modern Yellowknives members can be found in the adjoining, primarily Indigenous communities of Ndilǫ and Dettah.

The Yellowknife settlement is considered to have been founded in 1934, after gold was found in the area, although commercial activity in the present-day waterfront area did not begin until 1936. Yellowknife quickly became the centre of economic activity in the NWT, and was named the capital of the Northwest Territories in 1967. As gold production began to wane, Yellowknife shifted from being a mining town to a centre of government services in the 1980s. However, with the discovery of diamonds north of the city in 1991, this shift began to reverse. In recent years, tourism, transportation, and communications have also emerged as significant Yellowknife industries.

History 

Traditionally, First Nations people of the Yellowknives Dene culture occupied this region. By the 1930s, they had a settlement on a point of land on the east side of Yellowknife Bay, Dettah. The current municipal area of Yellowknife was occupied by prospectors who ventured into the region in the mid-1930s.

A Klondike-bound prospector, E.A. Blakeney, made the first discovery of gold in the Yellowknife Bay area in 1898. The discovery was viewed as unimportant in those days because of the Klondike Gold Rush and because Great Slave Lake was too far away to attract attention.

In the late 1920s, aircraft were first used to explore Canada's Arctic regions. Samples of uranium and silver were uncovered at Great Bear Lake in the early 1930s, and prospectors began fanning out to find additional metals. In 1933 two prospectors, Herb Dixon and Johnny Baker, canoed down the Yellowknife River from Great Bear Lake to survey for possible mineral deposits. They found gold samples at Quyta Lake, about  up the Yellowknife River, and some additional samples at Homer Lake.

The following year, Johnny Baker returned as part of a larger crew to develop the previous gold finds and search for more. Gold was found on the east side of Yellowknife Bay in 1934 and the short-lived Burwash Mine was developed. When government geologists uncovered gold in more favourable geology on the west side of Yellowknife Bay in the fall of 1935, a small staking rush occurred. From 1935 to 1937, one prospector and trapper named Winslow C. Ranney staked in the area between David Lake and Rater Lake with few commercial results. The nearby hill known as Ranney Hill is his namesake and a popular hiking destination today. Con Mine was the most impressive gold deposit and its development created the excitement that led to the first settlement of Yellowknife in 1936–1937. Some of the first businesses were Corona Inn, Weaver & Devore Trading, Yellowknife Supplies and post office, and The Wildcat Cafe. Con Mine entered production on 5 September 1938. Yellowknife boomed in the summer of 1938 and many new businesses were established, including the Canadian Bank of Commerce, Hudson's Bay Company, Vic Ingraham's first hotel, Sutherland's Drug Store, and a pool hall.

The population of Yellowknife quickly grew to 1,000 by 1940, and by 1942, five gold mines were in production in the Yellowknife region. However, by 1944, gold production had ground to a halt as men were needed for the war effort. An exploration program at the Giant Mine property on the north end of town had suggested a sizable gold deposit in 1944. This new find resulted in a massive post-war staking rush to Yellowknife. It also resulted in new discoveries at the Con Mine, greatly extending the life of the mine. The Yellowknife townsite expanded from the Old Town waterfront, and the new townsite was established during 1945–1946. The Discovery Mine, with its own townsite, operated  to the north-northeast of Yellowknife from 1950 to 1969.

Between 1939 and 1953, Yellowknife was controlled by the Northern Affairs department (now Indigenous and Northern Affairs Canada) of the Government of Canada. A small council, partially elected and partially appointed, made decisions. By 1953, Yellowknife had grown so much that it was made a municipality, with its own council and town hall. The first mayor of Yellowknife was Jock McNiven. In September 1967, Yellowknife officially became the capital of the Northwest Territories. This important new status sparked what has been coined as the third boom in Yellowknife. New sub-divisions were established to house an influx of government workers.

In 1978 the Soviet nuclear-powered satellite Kosmos 954 crashed to Earth near Yellowknife. There were no known casualties, although a small quantity of radioactive nuclear fuel was released into the environment, and Operation Morning Light—an attempt to retrieve it—was only partially successful.

The Giant Mine was the subject of a bombing during a labour dispute in 1992 that resulted in one of the deadliest mass murders in Canada with 9 deaths. The last of the gold mines in Yellowknife closed in 2004. Today, Yellowknife is primarily a government town and a service centre for the diamond mines. On 1 April 1999, its purview as capital of the NWT was reduced when the territory of Nunavut was split from the NWT. As a result, jurisdiction for that region of Canada was transferred to the new capital city of Iqaluit. Consequently, Yellowknife lost its standing as the Canadian capital city with the smallest population.

Geography 

Yellowknife is on the Canadian Shield, which was scoured down to rock during the last ice age. The surrounding landscape is very rocky and slightly rolling, with many small lakes in addition to the larger Great Slave Lake. Trees such as spruce and birch are abundant in the area, as are smaller bushes, but there are also many areas of relatively bare rock with lichen. Yellowknife's high latitude causes a large variation between day and night. Daylight hours range from five hours of daylight in December to 20 hours in June. Civil Twilight lasts all night from late May to mid-July.

Climate 
Yellowknife has a subarctic climate (Köppen: Dfc). Although winter is predominantly polar, rapid heat waves emerge at the summit of summer due to the immense path south. Due to its location on Great Slave Lake, Yellowknife has a frost-free growing season that averages slightly over 100 days. In an occasional year, the first fall frost does not come until October. Most of the limited precipitation falls between June and October, with April being the driest month of the year and August having the most rainfall. Snow that falls in winter accumulates on the ground until the spring thaw.

Yellowknife experiences very cold winters and mild to warm summers. According to Environment and Climate Change Canada, Yellowknife has the sunniest summer in the country, averaging 1,034 hours from June to August. Yellowknife averages 2256.5 hours of bright sunshine per year or 43.5% of possible daylight hours, ranging from a low of 15.4% in December to a high of 63.0% in June. Due to its warm summer temperatures, Yellowknife is well below the Arctic tree line in stark contrast to areas farther east in Canada on similar parallels.

In 2014, Environment Canada ranked Yellowknife as having the coldest winter and longest snow cover season of any city in Canada, while also experiencing the sunniest spring and summer of any city in Canada.

Cityscape 

Yellowknife, like most other urban centres, has distinct commercial, industrial, and residential areas. Frame Lake, Niven Lake, Range Lake, and Old Town are the residential sectors, with some of the population living in high-rises in the downtown core. Niven Lake is the only area under active development and expansion. Downtown Yellowknife is home to most of the city's commercial activity, though some retail does exist in Range Lake. Industrial activity is limited to the Kam Lake and airport subdivisions.

Houseboats 
Jolliffe Island sits in Yellowknife Bay and is public land under the jurisdiction of the City of Yellowknife after a land purchase when Imperial Oil vacated the site. The island is surrounded by a community of houseboats, where people have been living off the grid since 1978. Their relationship with the city is complex and often strained as the houseboats are popular with sightseers, but at the same time their residents live outside of the city's tax jurisdiction while still using city services, leading to lawsuits and tensions with the City of Yellowknife.

Government 

Yellowknife has a municipal government system and is governed by the Yellowknife City Council, which consists of an elected mayor and eight councillors. The Government of the Northwest Territories delegates powers to the municipality through legislative acts and regulations. Council meetings are held in the Council Chambers at City Hall on the second and fourth Monday of each month, and are open to the public. Municipal elections are held every three years. The current mayor of Yellowknife is Rebecca Alty, who succeeded Mark Heyck in 2018. Alty was elected 16 October 2018 and was sworn in 5 November.

Yellowknife is represented in the territorial government by seven of the 19 members of the Legislative Assembly of the Northwest Territories. These members, referred to as MLAs, are elected every four years and sit in the Northwest Territories Legislative Building, located in Yellowknife. The MLAs elect the Speaker of the House as well as six cabinet ministers and a premier, which forms the Executive Council of the Northwest Territories , also known as the cabinet. In addition, a Commissioner is appointed by the Federal Government to fulfil a similar role to that of the Lieutenant Governor. The Northwest Territories is one of only two federal, provincial or territorial jurisdictions in Canada that operate under a consensus system of government.

The Northwest Territories is in the federal electoral riding of the Northwest Territories and has one Member of Parliament, Michael McLeod, and one Senator, Margaret Dawn Anderson. Yellowknife is home to seven of the 19 electoral districts in the Northwest Territories, the Frame Lake, Great Slave, Kam Lake, Range Lake, Yellowknife Centre, Yellowknife North and Yellowknife South ridings.

Economy 

As the largest city in the Northwest Territories, Yellowknife is the hub for mining, industry, transportation, communications, education, health, tourism, commerce, and government activity in the territory. Historically, Yellowknife's economic growth came from gold mining, and later government; however, because of falling gold prices and increased operating costs, the final gold mine closed in 2004, marking a turning point for Yellowknife's economy.

After a downturn in the 1990s during the closure of the gold mines and the downsizing of the government workforce in 1999, Yellowknife's economy has recovered, largely because of the diamond boom; the Ekati Diamond Mine, owned and operated by BHP Billiton (sold to Dominion Diamond Corporation in 2013), opened in 1998. A second mine, Diavik Diamond Mine, began production in 2003. This ranked Canada third in world diamond production by value, and sixth by weight. A third mine, the De Beers owned Snap Lake Diamond Mine, received final approval and funding in 2005 and went into production in 2007. De Beers also applied in 2005 for a permit to open the Gahcho Kue Diamond Mine Project on the property formerly known as Kennady Lake. The mine was officially opened on 20 September 2016, and began commercial production in March 2017. As well, growth and expansion in natural gas development and exploration sectors has contributed to this growth. Economic growth in the Northwest Territories was 10.6% in 2003.

The major employers in Yellowknife include the Territorial Government, the Federal Government, Diavik Diamond Mines, Dominion Diamonds, DeBeers Canada, First Air, NorthwesTel, RTL Robinson Trucking, and the City of Yellowknife. Government employment accounts for 7,644 jobs, a large percentage of those in Yellowknife.
During winter, the Tibbitt to Contwoyto Winter Road is opened for semi-trailer truck traffic to take supplies from Yellowknife north to various mines located in the Northwest Territories and Nunavut. This ice road is usually open from the end of January through late March or early April, and Yellowknife becomes the dispatch point for the large number of truck drivers that come north to drive on the ice roads. During the 2007 ice road season, several drivers were featured on the History Channel TV series Ice Road Truckers.

Tourism is the largest renewable industry in the NWT and Yellowknife is the main entry point for visitors. Many tourists come to experience the Northern climate and traditional lifestyle, as well as to see the aurora. In 2004–2005, visitors to the territory spent  million.

The City of Yellowknife raises 50% of its operating revenue through property taxation. Both Yellowknife Education District No. 1 and Yellowknife Catholic School Board also raise a portion of their operating revenue through property taxation. Property taxes in Yellowknife are calculated through property assessment and the municipal and education mill rates. Mill rates in 2005 were 13.84 (residential) and 19.87 (commercial).

Canadian North, a regional airline, was headquartered in Yellowknife, in the Northwest Tower in downtown. The airline announced that when its lease was to expire in the end of August 2013, the airline will vacate the office and move it and 20 employees out of Yellowknife. The airline is now headquartered in Calgary.

Former regional mines 

Yellowknife was originally established as a supply centre for numerous gold mines operating in the region in the late 1930s and early 1940s. The following is a list of the major mines, all of which are now closed. There were also tungsten, tantalum and uranium mines in the vicinity. Most mines in the Yellowknife area are within the Kam Group, a part of the Yellowknife greenstone belt.

Infrastructure

Emergency services 

Policing in Yellowknife is provided by the Royal Canadian Mounted Police (RCMP); Yellowknife is the headquarters for G Division, and houses more than 30 officers.
The City of Yellowknife Municipal Enforcement Division (MED) is responsible for municipal bylaw infractions and traffic infractions (within city limits). The Yellowknife Fire Department handles the city's fire, ambulance, rescue, and hazardous materials responses. A point of debate in recent years has been the implementation of 911 services in Yellowknife (currently one may now dial 911) through a partnership with five other Northwest Territories communities; the cost of installation is currently estimated at around $1 million a year. There have been a number of incidents where emergency services have been either misdirected, or improperly dispatched. Health services are provided through the local Stanton Territorial Hospital. The Yellowknife Primary Care Centre has a broad range of practitioners including physicians, nurse practitioners, nurses, counsellors, dietitians and more. Services provided at the Yellowknife Primary Care Centre include mental health, diabetes education, diagnostic imaging, psychiatry and some home care services.

Utilities and services

Communications 
Yellowknife's telephone services were established in 1947 by the independent Yellowknife Telephone Company, owned by investors mostly within the community. The system was sold at the end of 1963 to Canadian National Telecommunications, now Northwestel. Northwestel also provides manual mobile telephone service on VHF frequencies, and by the 1990s also provided cellular services that were later transferred to Bell Mobility. In 2008, northern-based company Ice Wireless entered the market in Yellowknife, providing digital cellular products and services.

Yellowknife's television services, in addition to over-the-air transmission begun in 1967, included the Mackenzie Media cable television system placed in service 1 September 1972, which was sold to Northwestel in late 1995.

Electricity 

Electricity is provided to Yellowknife by Northland Utilities, serving 6,350 residential and 800 commercial customers. Yellowknife operates almost entirely on hydroelectricity from the Snare-Bluefish systems, provided by the Northwest Territories Power Corporation (NTPC). NTPC's local production capacity is 67.9 megawatts, 30.89 MW from 10 generators at the Jackfish Diesel Plant, 28.8 MW from Snare Lake, and 7.5 MW from Miramar Bluefish.

Solid waste services 
Residential garbage removal is through a user pay system, in which residents are allowed three  garbage bags per week; any additional bags must have a purchased tag.

Water and sewage treatment 
The City of Yellowknife provides pressurized potable water throughout the majority of the city, and has a network of gravity-fed sewage lines; trucked water and sewage is provided in areas not serviced by piped infrastructure. Sewage, with the aid of lift stations, is pumped to a series of lakes, referred to as Fiddler's Lake Lagoon, where it is held and allowed to naturally decompose. Water is obtained from the Yellowknife River and is disinfected with chlorine and liquid fluoride is added, but is not otherwise filtered or treated.

Transportation 

Yellowknife, while isolated geographically, has a modern transportation system. The Yellowknife Airport is the busiest airport in northern Canada, having 70,699 aircraft movements in 2007 and handling over 400,000 passengers and 30,000 tonnes of cargo yearly. The Yellowknife airport is designated by the Royal Canadian Air Force (RCAF) as a forward operating location for the CF-18 Hornet. Despite its shorter runways, the airport can still accommodate 747s and other wide-body aircraft for emergency landings. Air traffic control services, Instrument landing system (Category 1), and radar services are provided by Nav Canada.

Yellowknife Transit is the public transportation agency in the city, and is the only transit system in the Northwest Territories.

Road construction in Yellowknife is often a challenge due to the presence of permafrost which requires that roads generally be regraded and resurfaced every 10 to 20 years. Winter snow removal is done on a regular schedule by the City of Yellowknife public works department. School zones and playground zones are in effect 24 hours per day, 7 days per week. The highway system in the NWT is maintained by the Government of the Northwest Territories. Highway 4 (Ingraham Trail) and Highway 3 (Yellowknife Highway) both run through Yellowknife and are all-weather roads. One well-known, almost infamous, road in Yellowknife is Ragged Ass Road, after which Tom Cochrane named an album.

Until 2012, Yellowknife did not have a permanent road connection to the rest of Canada's highway network, as the Yellowknife Highway relied, depending on the season, on ferry service or an ice road to cross the Mackenzie River. With the completion of the Deh Cho Bridge, which officially opened on 30 November 2012, the city now has its first direct road connection to the rest of the country. One still-used ice road connects Yellowknife with the neighbouring community of Dettah,  to the southeast across an arm of Great Slave Lake; or a  drive via the Ingraham Trail.

Demographics

As of the 2016 Census, there were 19,569 people and 7,130 households in the city. The 2016 Census found that 22.7% of residents identified as Indigenous. In 2017, the Government of the Northwest Territories reported that the population was 20,834 with an average yearly growth rate of 0.6% from 2007.

In Yellowknife, the population is slightly younger at 34.6 than the average age for the rest of the NWT which is 34.9. However, the population is slightly disproportionate in terms of age distribution compared to the national average of 41.0. As of the 2016 figures, 13.9% of residents were 9 or under, 6.0% were from 10 to 14 years old, 13.1% were from 15 to 24, 34.1.2% were from 25 to 44, 22.0% were from 45 to 59, and 10.9% were 60 or older.

In 2016, the average household size was 2.7 and the majority of the population with children had either one or two. In 2016, the unemployment rate was at 5.9%; the employment rate for males was 80.1%, for females it was 75.2%.

The crime rate in Yellowknife for 2016 was 46.7 (per 1,000 persons) for violent crimes, and 167.2 (per 1,000 persons) for property crimes. There were 299 births and 62 deaths in 2014.

Immigration 
The 2021 census reported that immigrants (individuals born outside Canada) comprise 3,260 persons or 16.4% of the total population of Yellowknife. Of the total immigrant population, the top countries of origin were Philippines (965 persons or 29.6%), India (200 persons or 6.1%), United Kingdom (195 persons or 6.0%), Vietnam (160 persons or 4.9%), United States of America (110 persons or 3.4%), Germany (95 persons or 2.9%), Zimbabwe (75 persons or 2.3%), South Africa (75 persons or 2.3%), China (75 persons or 2.3%), Bangladesh (65 persons or 2.0%), Somalia (65 persons or 2.0%), and Pakistan (65 persons or 2.0%).

Yellowknife is home to 695 recent immigrants (arriving between 2011 and 2016) who now make up 3.7% of the population. Of the recent immigrants 70.5% came from Asia; 15.1% from Africa and 7.2% from both the Americas and Europe. Of the recent immigrants 40.0% came from the Philippines, while 10.8% came from several African countries, 5.8% each from India, the United Kingdom and Vietnam, 4.3% from each of Japan and South Korea and 2.2% from Israel.

Ethnicity 
As of 2021, Yellowknife has a slight European majority with a population of 11,110 (55.8% of total). The total Indigenous peoples population is 4,810 representing 24.2% of the population (14.6% First Nations, 5.3% Métis, 3.5% Inuit, and 0.8% gave other Indigenous response). Other ethnic groups include Filipino with 1,375 residents (6.9% of total), Black with 875 residents (4.4% of total), and South Asian with 615 residents (3.1% of total) with a total visible minority population of 3,990 (20.0% of total).

Note: Totals greater than 100% due to multiple origin responses.

Language 
English was the mother tongue of 80.0% of residents and 3.2% spoke French. Of the nine official languages of the Northwest Territories 0.4% spoke Chipewyan (Dene); 0.1% spoke a Cree language; 0.1% spoke Gwich’in; 0.4% spoke Inuktitut; 0.1% spoke Inuinnaqtun or Inuvialuktun; 0.6% spoke North or South Slavey and 1.2% spoke Tłı̨chǫ (Dogrib). In total 3.0% of the population said that an Indigenous language was their mother tongue.

Not including the 11 official languages there are over 70 different languages that Yellowknifers stated were their mother tongue. These include Indo-European languages (4.2%); Austronesian languages (3.9%); Indo-Iranian languages and Germanic languages (1.1% each); Sino-Tibetan languages and Chinese languages and Indo-Aryan languages (1.0% each). The five main individual languages are Tagalog (3.2%); Vietnamese (0.8%); German (0.6%); Cantonese and Spanish (0.5% each).

Religion 
According to the 2021 census, religious groups in Yellowknife included:
Christianity (9,705 persons or 48.7%)
Irreligion (8,840 persons or 44.4%)
Islam (610 persons or 3.1%)
Buddhism (225 persons or 1.1%)
Hinduism (130 persons or 0.7%)
Sikhism (105 persons or 0.5%)
Indigenous Spirituality (100 persons or 0.5%)
Judaism (35 persons or 0.2%)
Other (165 persons or 0.8%)

In the 2001 Census almost 73% of residents identified as Christian while 24% said they had no religious affiliation.. For specific denominations Statistics Canada found that 36% of residents identified as Roman Catholic, 11% as Anglican, 10% for the United Church, about 2% each as Baptists, Lutheran, and Pentecostal, and more than 1% for The Salvation Army. There were also 135 Buddhists, 125 Muslims, and 15 Jews.

Culture

Events 

 Folk on the Rocks is a local music festival that has been an annual occurrence since 1980. The event features a wide variety of musical acts; it is not limited to only Folk. In the past, it has drawn acts such as Buffy Sainte-Marie, the Trailer Park Boys, The Weakerthans, African Guitar Summit, Corb Lund, Fred Penner, Stan Rogers, Gord Downie, Tanya Tagaq, Dan Mangan, Sam Roberts Band, Sloan, The Strumbellas, Joel Plaskett, Ron Sexsmith and Hawksley Workman.
 The Midnight Sun Golf Tournament, with games played through the city's well-lit summer nights, is also a significant cultural event.
 During the winter, there is the Snowking Winter Festival, featuring a snow castle on Great Slave Lake which hosts a month of cultural activities
 The Long John Jamboree, a new winter festival, took place 23–25 March 2012 on the frozen Yellowknife Bay next to the Snowking castle, in Yellowknife's Old Town neighbourhood. Events include an ice sculpture contest sponsored by De Beers Canada, cultural events like Dene hand games, games, live music, a beer garden, food vendors, skating rink, artist's market, and much more.
 Yellowknife hosted the inaugural 1970 Arctic Winter Games, and has since hosted athletes and artists from circumpolar regions at the biennial multi-sport and multi-cultural event in 1984, 1990, 1998, and 2008 Arctic Winter Games.
 The Old Town Ramble & Ride Festival started in 2006 and happens every summer for three days on the August long weekend. This free outdoor festival promotes local art, culture, music, artisans, dance, storytelling, workshops, tours, children's area and more.
 The Yellowknife International Film Festival is an annual film festival held in the city. The Dead North Film Festival, a genre film festival for horror, fantasy and science fiction films, was also staged from 2012 to 2020, but is currently on hiatus.
 Yellowknife Farmers Market is a seasonal farmers market in Yellowknife, held every Tuesday from June to September at Somba K'e Civic Plaza.

Attractions 

Some notable places to visit in Yellowknife include:
 The Wildcat Cafe, which first opened in 1937. The popular restaurant still operates in its original building during the summer, which was moved to its current location after being saved from demolition in the late 1970s. The Wildcat Cafe was renovated from 2011 to 2013. The City hosted a grand opening of the new Wildcat Cafe on 16 June 2013.
 The Gold Range Bar, (also known as The Strange Range and listed in the circa 1989 phonebook as such) one of the oldest and most colourful drinking establishments in the Northwest Territories and featured in Elizabeth Hay's novel "Late Nights On Air" and Mordecai Richler's novel Solomon Gursky Was Here.
 Downtown contains the Capital Area Park, a short but pleasant stroll by City Hall, the Prince of Wales Northern Heritage Centre, the Legislature.
 The Prince of Wales Northern Heritage Centre is a museum containing exhibits of the history and culture of Inuit, Inuvialuit, Dene, Métis and non-aboriginal peoples of the NWT. It is found just north of downtown on an attractive location overlooking Frame Lake.
 Near the Prince of Wales Northern Heritage Centre, the Northwest Territories Legislative Building houses the territory's legislative assembly.
 The Northern Arts and Cultural Centre, which is located in Sir John Franklin High School and is the city's largest indoor stage for theatre and musical presentations.
 Elon the Muskox (Elon Muskox), a mosaiculture horticultural living sculpture of a muskox exhibited in front of City Hall.
 Centre Square Mall: Northewest Territories' largest shopping mall and the tallest building in Northern Canada. Centre Square Mall contains many shops, the Yellowknife Public Library, and the Yellowknife Visitor Centre.

Other notable attractions include the Ingraham Trail, local fishing lodges, bush plane tours, the unique architecture of Old Town with the Bush Pilots monument, and any of the numerous lakes surrounding Yellowknife, many of which include beaches.

Historical sites 

 Back Bay Cemetery – pioneer graveyard, 1938
 Bank of Toronto – log cabin bank, 1944
 Canadian Pacific Airlines floatbase – Old Town float plane base, 1946
 Fireweed Studio – Giant Mine log cabin, 1939
 Hudson's Bay Warehouse – Hudson's Bay Company trading post, 1945
 Log School House – Yellowknife's first school, 1939
 Old Fort Providence – first trading post in the region, 1789
 Weaver & Devore Trading – in operation since 1936
 The Wildcat Cafe – longest serving restaurant
 Post Office – community post office since 1956

Media

Print 
The Yellowknifer, published by Northern News Services, is the major newspaper serving Yellowknife, published twice weekly on Wednesday and Friday. Northern News Services also publishes Northwest Territories News/North every Monday, which serves the entire NWT. As well, there is L'Aquilon, a French language newspaper published weekly. Edge Magazine is also based in Yellowknife where it began it 2011 and covers arts, events, people, culture and economy around the city.

Two magazines are based in Yellowknife: Above&Beyond and Up Here, both offering northern-related news and lifestyle articles.

Radio

Television 

No part of the Northwest Territories is designated as a mandatory market for digital television conversion; only CFYK-DT converted its main transmitter in Yellowknife to digital.

On 10 August 2012, NASA announced that the section of Mars where the Curiosity of the Mars Science Laboratory mission landed would be renamed Yellowknife, in recognition of the city of Yellowknife. Yellowknife is usually where scientists start geological mapping expeditions when researching the oldest known rocks in North America.

Notable people 

 Deena Hinshaw, Chief Medical Officer of Alberta
 Margot Kidder, film and television actress best known for playing Lois Lane in the Superman movies of the 1970s and 1980s, was born in Yellowknife
 Kevin Koe, World Champion Curler.
 Shane Koyczan, poet of anti-bullying poem "To This Day" among others
 Tobias Mehler, film and television actor best known for his roles on Battlestar Galactica and Stargate SG-1
 Vic Mercredi, Métis hockey player, first person born in the NWT to be drafted into the National Hockey League
 Dustin Milligan, film and television actor; lead actor in the first season of the Beverly Hills, 90210 spinoff and regular on Schitt's Creek.
 John Sissons, politician and the first judge of the Supreme Court of the Northwest Territories
 Greg Vaydik, National Hockey League player
 Max Ward, pioneering bush pilot and founder of Wardair, later sold to Canadian Airlines
 Ewan Affleck, Canadian general practitioner and receiver of Order of Canada.

See also 

 Arctic Air
 CFNA HQ Yellowknife
 Fred Henne Territorial Park
 History of Northwest Territories capital cities
 List of mayors of Yellowknife
 List of municipalities in the Northwest Territories
 List of tallest buildings in Yellowknife
 Stanton Territorial Hospital
 Yellowknife Water Aerodrome

Notes

References

Further reading

External links 

 

 
1936 establishments in the Northwest Territories
Cities in the Northwest Territories
Hudson's Bay Company trading posts
Mining communities in the Northwest Territories
Populated places established in 1936